Nicole Coviello is a Canadian marketing professor. She is the inaugural Lazaridis Chair of International Entrepreneurship and Innovation at Wilfrid Laurier University’s Lazaridis School of Business and Economics. In 2021, Coviello was recognized as a leading researcher in her field by Stanford University.

Early life and education
Coviello received her Bachelor of Commerce and Master's degree (technology management) from the University of Saskatchewan. Following this, she earned her PhD in marketing and international business from the University of Auckland. In 2010, she received an Honorary Doctorate in Economics from the University of Turku.

Career
Coviello's career started in 1987 at the University of Waikato in Hamilton, New Zealand. In 1990, she accepted a position at the University of Auckland, and simultaneously, completed her Ph.D. in Marketing and International Business. Following this, Coviello became an associate professor of Marketing at the University of Calgary's Haskayne School of Business in 1996. During this time, Coviello published her research on networks and internationalization that helped form the field now known as International Entrepreneurship. In 1997, she published an article based on her PhD research that argues a young firm's network relationships with large partners may actually slow market expansion by restricting the development of other relationships. Two years later, she published Internationalisation and the Smaller Firm: A Review of Contemporary Empirical Research, which assessed and integrated existing research about the internationalization of small firms. In 2002, Coviello published How Firms Relate to their Markets based on her long-standing work with the Contemporary Marketing Practices program.  That year, she also left Calgary to return to her alma mater, the University of Auckland, as a professor of International Entrepreneurship and Marketing. Coviello remained there until 2008 when she moved to Wilfrid Laurier University. She joined Laurier as professor of Marketing and was later appointed as the Betty and Peter Sims professor of Entrepreneurship. In 2009, Coviello was appointed as Associate Editor of Journal of Business Venturing and later became a consulting editor at the Journal of International Business Studies. Coviello was also on a partial appointment as a visiting professor at the Turku School of Economics from 2013 to 2015.

Coviello continue to focus her research on international entrepreneurship and marketing at Laurier. In 2014, she was ranked eighteenth in the world for International Business, the only female in the top 20 list for that discipline. In 2016, Coviello was named Lazaridis Research Professor and Research Director of the Lazaridis Institute for the Management of Technology Enterprises. In 2018, four of her papers were recognized in the top 25 of the most influential publications in International Marketing. These publications included Network Relationships and the Internationalisation Process of Small Software Firms, Internationalisation: Conceptualizing an Entrepreneurial Process of Behavior in Time, The Network Dynamics of International New Ventures, and Internationalisation and the Smaller Firm: A Review of Contemporary Empirical Research.

In 2020, Coviello was appointed as the inaugural Lazaridis Chair of International Entrepreneurship and Innovation at Laurier’s Lazaridis School of Business and Economics. Later that year, she was elected a Fellow of the Academy of International Business and received the 2020 Gerald E. Hills Best Paper Award for her 2012 paper, Creating Major Innovations with Customers: Insights from Small and Young Technology Firms. In 2021, Coviello was recognized as a leading researcher (top 1%) in the field of business and management by Stanford University.

References

External links

Living people
Year of birth missing (living people)
Marketing women
People from Saskatoon
Academic staff of the University of Calgary
Academic staff of Wilfrid Laurier University
Academic staff of the University of Auckland
University of Saskatchewan alumni
University of Auckland alumni
Academic journal editors